Sulpicius Galba may refer to:
 Galba, Roman emperor in 68–69
 Gaius Sulpicius Galba (consul AD 22)
 Publius Sulpicius Galba Maximus
 Servius Sulpicius Galba (disambiguation)

See also
 
 Sulpicia_gens#Sulpicii_Galbae